Michael F. Newlin (born January 2, 1949) is a retired American basketball player in the National Basketball Association (NBA). A feisty 6'4" (1.93 m), 200 lb (91 kg) guard from the University of Utah, he played 11 professional seasons (1971–1982), spending most of his time with the Houston Rockets. He played in several playoff series, including the 1977 Eastern Conference Finals, which the Rockets would lose to the Philadelphia 76ers led by Julius Erving. He also played for the New Jersey Nets and New York Knicks.  He had his finest season in 1980–81, when he averaged 21.4 points per game for the Nets, and he retired in 1982 with 12,507 career points.

External links
 Career Stats
 ClutchFans.net Profile – Houston Rocket Fan Site
 Where is He Now?

1949 births
Living people
American men's basketball players
Basketball players from Portland, Oregon
Houston Rockets players
New Jersey Nets players
New York Knicks players
San Diego Rockets draft picks
Shooting guards
Utah Utes men's basketball players